Betatao is a rural commune in Analamanga Region, in the  Central Highlands of Madagascar. It belongs to the district of Anjozorobe and its populations numbers to 13,112 in 2018.

Economy
The economy is based on agriculture.  Rice, corn, peanuts, beans, manioc, soja and oignons are the main crops.

References

External links

Populated places in Analamanga